Arizona Whirlwind is a 1944 American Western film directed by Robert Emmett Tansey. It stars Ken Maynard, Hoot Gibson, and Bob Steele.

Cast
 Ken Maynard as U.S. Marshal
 Hoot Gibson as U.S. Marshal
 Bob Steele as himself
 Ian Keith as Polini
 Ernie Adams as Warren, the Jewel Cutter
 Myrna Dell as Ruth Hampton
 Karl Hackett as Banker Steve Lynch
 Charles King as Henchman Duke Rollins
 Don Stewart as Donny Davis
 Bud Osborne as Henchman

See also

 Hoot Gibson filmography
 List of American films of 1944

References

External links
 

1944 films
1944 Western (genre) films
American Western (genre) films
American black-and-white films
Films directed by Robert Emmett Tansey
1940s English-language films
1940s American films